Booker Telleferro Ervin II (October 31, 1930 – August 31, 1970) was an American tenor saxophone player. His tenor playing was characterised by a strong, tough sound and blues/gospel phrasing. He is remembered for his association with bassist Charles Mingus.

Biography
Ervin was born in Denison, Texas, United States. He first learned to play trombone at a young age from his father, who played the instrument with Buddy Tate. After leaving school, Ervin joined the United States Air Force, stationed in Okinawa, during which time he taught himself tenor saxophone. After completing his service in 1953, he studied at Berklee College of Music in Boston, Massachusetts. Moving to Tulsa in 1954, he played with the band of Ernie Fields.

After stays in Denver and Pittsburgh, Ervin moved to New York City in spring 1958, initially working a day job and playing jam sessions at night. Ervin then worked with Charles Mingus regularly from late 1958 to 1960, rejoining various outfits led by the bassist at various times up to autumn 1964, when he departed for Europe. During the mid-1960s, Ervin led his own quartet, recording for Prestige Records with, among others, ex-Mingus associate pianist Jaki Byard, along with bassist Richard Davis and Alan Dawson on drums.

Ervin later recorded for Blue Note Records and played with pianist Randy Weston, with whom he recorded between 1963 and 1966. Weston said: "Booker Ervin, for me, was on the same level as John Coltrane. He was a completely original saxophonist.... He was a master.... 'African Cookbook', which I composed back in the early '60s, was partly named after Booker because we (musicians) used to call him 'Book,' and we would say, 'Cook, Book.' Sometimes when he was playing we'd shout, 'Cook, Book, cook.' And the melody of 'African Cookbook' was based upon Booker Ervin's sound, a sound like the north of Africa. He would kind of take those notes and make them weave hypnotically. So, actually the African Cookbook was influenced by Booker Ervin."

Between October 1964 to summer 1966, Ervin worked and lived in Europe, playing gigs in France, Spain, Italy, Germany, Norway, Sweden, Denmark and The Netherlands. Basing himself in Barcelona, he featured regularly at the city's Jamboree Club. He recorded and broadcast while overseas, making albums with his own quartet, Dexter Gordon and Catalan vocalist Núria Feliu, featuring on various radio programmes and appearing at several jazz festivals, including a guest slot at the 1965 Berlin Jazz Festival, during which he performed a twenty-five-minute improvisation. This performance was issued as "Blues For You" on the album Lament For Booker Ervin (Enja Records) in 1977.

Following his return to the United States in summer 1966, Ervin led his own groups in jazz clubs throughout the country, and appeared at both the Newport Jazz Festival (1967) and the Monterey Jazz Festival (1966) performing with Randy Weston; a recording of their performance was issued on CD in 1994. In 1968, he again appeared at clubs and festivals in Scandinavia, broadcasting with the Danish Radio Big Band. He recorded again for Prestige, but in late 1966 was signed to  West Coast label, Pacific Jazz, for whom he taped two albums, Structurally Sound and Booker 'n' Brass (1967), before switching to Blue Note. Ervin recorded two Blue Note albums under his own name, In Between and Tex Book Tenor, the latter going unissued during his lifetime, initially being released in the 1970s as part of a double album shared with recordings (on which Ervin features) made under the leadership of Horace Parlan (Back from the Gig). In 2005, Blue Note issued as single CD of Tex Book Tenor in its limited edition Connoisseur series.

His final recorded appearance occurred in January 1969, when he guested on a further Prestige album headed by teenage multi-instrumentalist Eric Kloss.

Ervin died of kidney disease in New York City in 1970, aged 39. Most biographical accounts of Ervin's death give an incorrect date. His gravestone in The National Cemetery, East Farmingdale, New York, clearly shows the date as August 31, 1970.

In 2017, Ervin was the subject of a mini-biography written by English saxophonist and author Simon Spillett, published as part of an anthology package titled The Good Book (Acrobat Records)

Discography

As leader
1960: The Book Cooks (Bethlehem)
1960: Cookin' (Savoy)
1961: That's It! (Candid)
1963: Exultation! (Prestige)
1963: Gumbo! (Prestige) – with Pony Poindexter
1963: The Freedom Book (Prestige)
1964: The Song Book (Prestige)
1964: The Blues Book (Prestige)
1964: The Space Book  (Prestige)
1965: Groovin' High (Prestige)
1965: The Trance (Prestige)
1965: Setting the Pace (Prestige) - with Dexter Gordon
1966: Heavy!!! (Prestige)
1966: Structurally Sound (Pacific Jazz)
1967: Booker 'n' Brass (Pacific Jazz)
1968: The In Between  (Blue Note)
1968: Tex Book Tenor (Blue Note)
Back from the Gig (Blue Note, issued 1976) – recorded 1964 and 1968; 2-LP set of two previously unreleased sessions, which were later issued as Horace Parlan's Happy Frame of Mind in 1988 and Ervin's Tex Book Tenor in 2005.

As sideman
With Bill Barron
Hot Line (Savoy, 1962 [1964])
With Jaki Byard
Out Front! (Prestige, 1964)
With Teddy Charles
Jazz In The Garden At The Museum Of Modern Art (Warwick, 1960)
With Ted Curson
Urge (Fontana, 1966)
With Núria Feliu
Núria Feliu with Booker Ervin (Edigsa, 1965)
With Roy Haynes
Cracklin' (New Jazz, 1963)
With Andrew Hill
Grass Roots (Blue Note, 1968)
With Eric Kloss
In the Land of the Giants (Prestige, 1969)
With Lambert, Hendricks & Bavan
Havin' a Ball at the Village Gate (RCA, 1963)
With Charles Mingus
Jazz Portraits: Mingus in Wonderland (United Artists, 1959)
Mingus Ah Um (Columbia, 1959)
Mingus Dynasty (Columbia, 1959)
Blues & Roots (Atlantic, 1959)
Mingus (Candid, 1960)
Mingus at Antibes (Atlantic, 1960 [1976])
Reincarnation of a Lovebird (Candid, 1960)
Oh Yeah (Atlantic, 1961)
Tonight at Noon (Atlantic, 1957-61 [1965])
Mingus Mingus Mingus Mingus Mingus (Impulse!, 1963)
With Horace Parlan
Up & Down (Blue Note, 1961)
Happy Frame of Mind (Blue Note, 1963 [1988])
With Don Patterson
The Exciting New Organ of Don Patterson (Prestige, 1964)
Hip Cake Walk (Prestige, 1964)
Patterson's People (Prestige, 1964)
Tune Up! (Prestige, 1964 [1971])
With Sonny Stitt
Soul People (Prestige, 1965)
With Mal Waldron
The Quest (New Jazz, 1961)
With Randy Weston
Highlife (Colpix, 1963)
Randy (Bakton, 1964) - also released as African Cookbook (Atlantic) in 1972
Monterey '66 (Verve, 1966 [1994])

References

1930 births
1970 deaths
20th-century African-American musicians
20th-century American male musicians
20th-century American saxophonists
American jazz tenor saxophonists
American male jazz musicians
American male saxophonists
Blue Note Records artists
Deaths from kidney disease
Hard bop saxophonists
Jazz musicians from Texas
Mainstream jazz saxophonists
People from Denison, Texas
Post-bop saxophonists
Prestige Records artists
Savoy Records artists
Transatlantic Records artists